Hermann Huppen (born 17 July 1938) is a Belgian comic book artist.  He is better known under his pen-name Hermann. He is most famous for his post-apocalyptic comic  Jeremiah which was made into a television series.

Biography

Hermann was born in 1938 in Bévercé (now a part of Malmedy) in Liège Province. After studying to become a furniture maker and working as interior architect, Hermann made his debut as comic book artist in 1964 in the Franco-Belgian comics magazine Spirou with a four-page story. Greg noticed his talent and offered him to work for his studio. In 1966, he began illustrating the Bernard Prince series written by Greg, published in Tintin magazine. In 1969, also in collaboration with Greg, he began the western series Comanche. This appeared at the same time as other western series such as Blueberry.

Hermann began writing his own stories in 1977, starting the post-apocalyptic Jeremiah series, which is still produced today. In the same period, he also made three albums of Nick, inspired by Little Nemo in Slumberland, for Spirou. In 1983 he began a new series, Les Tours de Bois-Maury, which is set in the Middle Ages and is less focused on action than his other works.

Hermann is characterized by a realistic style and stories that are both somber and angry, with a sense of disillusion with regards to the human character in general, and current society more specifically.

Awards
 1973: Prix Saint-Michel, Belgium
 1980: Prix Saint-Michel
 1992: Best Long Comic Strip at the Haxtur Awards, Spain
 - nominated for Best Drawing at the Haxtur Awards
 1999: nominated for Best Drawing and Best Cover at the Haxtur Awards
 2001: Best Drawing at the Haxtur Awards
 - nominated for Best Short Comic Strip and Best Script at the Haxtur Awards
 2002: Grand Prix Saint-Michel
 - nominated for Best Short Comic Strip and Best Drawing at the Haxtur Awards
 2003: nominated for the Audience Award and the Artwork Award at the Angoulême International Comics Festival, France
 2005: nominated for the Audience Award at the Angoulême International Comics Festival
 2006: nominated for Best Comic (French language) at the Prix Saint-Michel
 2010: nominated for Best Artwork at the Prix Saint-Michel

Selected bibliography
All of these comics have been published in French, Dutch and German: other translations are noted in the "remarks" column.

References

Sources

 Béra, Michel; Denni, Michel; and Mellot, Philippe (2002): "Trésors de la Bande Dessinée 2003-2004". Paris, Les éditions de l'amateur. 
 Hermann publications in Spirou, Belgian Tintin, French Tintin, Circus / Vécu , BoDoï BDoubliées

External links
 Hermann Huppen official site
 Hermann biography on Lambiek Comiclopedia
 Hermann fan site 

1938 births
Living people
People from Malmedy
Belgian comics artists
Belgian comics writers
Grand Prix de la ville d'Angoulême winners